Insectary plants are those that attract insects. As such, beneficial insectary plants are intentionally introduced into an ecosystem to increase pollen and nectar resources required by the natural enemies of the harmful or unwanted insects pests. Beyond an effective natural control of pests, the beneficial insects also assist in pollination.

The "friendly insects" include ladybeetles, bees, ground beetles, hoverflies, and parasitic wasps. Other animals that are frequently considered beneficial include lizards, spiders, toads, and hummingbirds. Beneficial insects are as much as ten times more abundant in the insectary plantings area. Mortality of scale insects (caused by natural enemies) can be double with insectary plantings. In addition, a diversity of insectary plants can increase the population of beneficial insects such that these levels can be sustained even when the insectary plants are removed or die off.

For maximum benefit in the garden, insectary plants can be grown alongside desired garden plants that do not have this benefit. The insects attracted to the insectary plants will also help the other nearby garden plants.

Many members of the family Apiaceae (formerly known as Umbelliferae) are excellent insectary plants. Fennel, angelica, coriander (cilantro), dill, and wild carrot all provide in great number the tiny flowers required by parasitic wasps. Various clovers, yarrow, and rue also attract parasitic and predatory insects. Low-growing plants, such as thyme, rosemary, or mint, provide shelter for ground beetles and other beneficial insects. Composite flowers (daisy and chamomile) and mints (spearmint, peppermint, or catnip) will attract predatory wasps, hoverflies, and robber flies. The wasps will catch caterpillars and grubs to feed their young, while the predatory and parasitic flies attack many kinds of insects, including leaf hoppers and caterpillars.

Other insectary plants include: mustard plants such as Brassica juncea, Phacelia tanacetifolia, buckwheat (Fagopyrum esculentum), marigold (Tagetes patula), elderberry, Korean licorice mint (Agastache rugosa), blackberry, Convolvulus, Crataegus, Anthriscus sylvestris, Chrysanthemum segetum, Scrophularia, Rosa canina, Hedera helix, Centaurea cyanus, Phacelia tanacetifolia, Escholzia californica, Prunus spinosa, Lobularia maritima.

See also
 Biological pest control
 Companion planting
 Beneficial weed
 Insect hotel

References

External links
 Enhancing Biological Control with Beneficial Insectary Plants - July 1998 - description
 Benefits of Insectary Plants
 Natural Pest Control See: tables
 http://eartheasy.com/grow_garden_insectary.htm  See: tables
 http://www.agroecology.org/cases/insectaryplants.htm case study
 Beneficial Insects for Gardens
 Those Amazing Hover Flies: Order Diptera, family Syrphidae
 Video: Efficient Intercropping with Sweet Alyssum for Aphid Control in Lettuce

Insect ecology
Plant ecology